Russell Allen (born July 19, 1971) is an American singer best known as the vocalist of the progressive metal band Symphony X. He has also worked with the supergroups Star One, Allen-Lande, Level 10, and as one of fourteen vocalists in the progressive symphonic metal band Trans-Siberian Orchestra. Since 2011, he has also served as the frontman and live bassist of the heavy metal band Adrenaline Mob.

Biography 

Before his music career began, Allen was a jouster at a Medieval Times Dinner Theater. He was introduced to the band Symphony X by former singer Rod Tyler. Allen has been the lead singer of Symphony X since 1995, releasing eight studio albums and one live album with the band.

His first solo album, Atomic Soul, was released April 25, 2005. As well as singing he also plays the bass when performing songs from Atomic Soul live.

He is referred to in various circles as "Sir Russell Allen", and he is credited as such on Arjen Lucassen's Star One albums, because of a joke that Arjen made regarding Allen's former job as a jouster.

In the summer of 2005 he went on tour with Symphony X on Dave Mustaine's Gigantour alongside such bands as Dream Theater, Megadeth, and Nevermore. The same year, he also made part of a duo melodic rock project with singer Jørn Lande (ex-Masterplan) called Allen/Lande, which has four albums, all released by Frontiers Records.

In addition to being Symphony X vocalist, he is also currently working in another band with guitarist Mike Orlando called Adrenaline Mob.

In November 2013, Allen joined Trans-Siberian Orchestra for their 2013 Fall/Winter tour and performed with the group at the Wacken Open Air 2015. He is also featured in their 2015 studio album Letters from the Labyrinth.

In 2014, a new project was announced, featuring Russell Allen with bassist Mat Sinner and other members of the German band Primal Fear, called Level 10, with an album release slated for January 2015. The release date and the name of the album were revealed in November 2013: it would be titled as Chapter One, to be released on January 23, 2015, in Europe and on January 27, 2014, in North America via Frontiers Music srl.

In 2015, Russell Allen recorded vocals for a new project of Whitesnake and former Night Ranger guitarist Joel Hoekstra called Joel Hoekstra's 13, with an album called Dying to Live, released on October 16. Russell sings lead vocals on half of the songs in the album with background vocals and the other half of lead vocals recorded by Jeff Scott Soto.

In 2020, Russell Allen collaborated with former Nightwish vocalist Anette Olzon on a new a duo melodic rock project under the name Allen/Olzon. Worlds Apart, their debut album, was released on March 6, 2020.

Musical style 

Multi-instrumentalist, singer and composer Arjen Lucassen has said the following regarding Russell Allen:

Allen has worked with Lucassen on various occasions: originally he sang the song "Dawn of a Million Souls" on Ayreon's 2000 album Universal Migrator Part 2: Flight of the Migrator (which also featured a guitar solo by Michael Romeo), and in 2002 he became one of the lead vocalists for Lucassen's project Star One.

Allen has stated in an interview that "Ronnie James Dio is definitely at the top of my list of influences" and also mentioned Bruce Dickinson of Iron Maiden and former Free and Bad Company singer Paul Rodgers as influences.

Discography

Solo 
 Atomic Soul (2005)

With Symphony X 
 The Damnation Game (1995)
 The Divine Wings of Tragedy (1997)
 Twilight in Olympus (1998)
 V: The New Mythology Suite (2000)
 Live on the Edge of Forever (2001)
 The Odyssey (2002)
 Paradise Lost (2007)
 Iconoclast (2011)
 Underworld (2015)

With Star One 
 Space Metal (2002)
 Live on Earth (2003)
 Victims of the Modern Age (2010)
 Revel in Time (2022)

With Allen/Lande 
 The Battle (2005)
 The Revenge (2007)
 The Showdown (2010)
 The Great Divide (2014)

With Adrenaline Mob 
 Adrenaline Mob (EP) (2011)
 Omertà (2012)
 Covertà (EP) (2013)
 Men of Honor (2014)
 Dearly Departed (EP) (2015)
 We The People (2017)

With Level 10 
 Chapter One (2015)

With Joel Hoekstra's 13 
 Dying to Live (2015)
 Running Games (2021)

With Allen/Olzon 
 Worlds Apart (2020)
 Army of Dreamers (2022)

As a guest

With Ayreon 
 Universal Migrator Part 2: Flight of the Migrator (2000) – guest vocals on "Dawn of a Million Souls"
 The Source (2017) – guest vocals as The President

With Genius – A Rock Opera 
 Episode 2: In Search of the Little Prince (2004) – as The Dream League Commander

With Avantasia 
 The Wicked Symphony (2010)
 Angel of Babylon (2010)

With ReVamp 
 ReVamp (2010) – guest vocals on Sweet Curse

With DGM 
 Momentum (2013) – guest vocals on Reason

With Takayoshi Ohmura 
 Devils in the Dark – guest vocals on "Delusional Dream" (2013)

With Timo Tolkki's Avalon 
 The Land of New Hope (2013)

With Magnus Karlsson 
 Free Fall (2013) – guest vocals on Free Fall

With Amadeus Awad's EON 
 The Book of Gates – (2014) – as The Pharaoh

With Noturnall 
 Noturnall (2014) – guest vocals on Nocturnal Human Side, producer

With Iced Earth 
 Plagues of Babylon (2014) – guest vocals on Highwayman

With Trans-Siberian Orchestra 
 Letters from the Labyrinth (2015) – guest vocals on Not Dead Yet

With Magni Animi Viri 
 Heroes Temporis (World Edition) (2016)

References

External links 

1971 births
Living people
American rock songwriters
American heavy metal singers
American male singer-songwriters
Musicians from Long Beach, California
Symphony X members
Singer-songwriters from California
Allen-Lande members
Star One (band) members
Adrenaline Mob members
21st-century American male singers
21st-century American singers